Kitee is a town and a municipality of Finland.

It is located in the province of Eastern Finland and is part of the North Karelia region. Neighbouring municipalities are Parikkala, Rääkkylä, Savonlinna and Tohmajärvi.

The municipality is unilingually Finnish.

History
Kitee is known as the ''moonshine city of Finland'' due to its legal and illegal moonshine manufacturing.

Villages

 Haapasalo
 Haarajärvi
 Hammaskallio
 Heinoniemi
 Jaakkima
 Juurikka
 Kantosyrjä
 Kiteenkylä
 Kiteenlahti
 Kontiola
 Kunonniemi
 Lahdenkylä
 Leinovaara
 Loukunvaara
 Misola
 Muljula
 Niinikumpu
 Nivunki
 Närsäkkälä
 Ojamäki
 Piimäjärvi
 Potoskavaara
 Puhos
 Puhossalo
 Päätye
 Riihijärvi
 Rokkala
 Ruppovaara
 Satulavaara
 Suoparsaari
 Suorlahti
 Särkijärvi
 Säynejärvi
 Taipale
 Tasapää
 Tolosenmäki
 Varmoniemi
 Välivaara

Notable residents
 Nils Ludvig Arppe, industrialist
 Tuomas Holopainen, musician
 Jukka Nevalainen, musician
 Tarja Turunen, musician
 Tomek Valtonen, ice hockey coach and player
 Emppu Vuorinen, musician
 Sami Vänskä, musician
 Antti Aalto, ski-jumper

References

External links

 Town of Kitee – official website

 
Cities and towns in Finland
Populated places established in 1631
1631 establishments in Sweden